Rubén Xaus (born 18 February 1978 in Barcelona, Catalonia, Spain) is a retired motorcycle road racer. During his career he competed in both the Superbike World Championship and the MotoGP. He is nicknamed 'Spider-Man', as his lanky frame leads him to hang over the bike in an unusual way.

Early years
His father, who competed in amateur mountain bicycle races, gave Xaus his first motorcycle at the age of five, a Montesa 25cc. Aged 14 he was racing dirt-bikes, but his father convinced him to turn his attentions towards road racing. Xaus took part in the 125cc Catalan Championship, the 125cc Solo Moto Criterium, and that same year he took victory in the 80cc Catalonia Supermoto Championship.

In 1994 he competed in the Open Ducados Supersport series in Spain – finishing 17th place, improving to third the following year. In 1995 he entered the FIM Thunderbike trophy and contested four 250cc Grand Prix. Xaus finished sixth in Thunderbike in 1996, moving to World Supersport in 1997 taking 17th overall.

In 1998 he rode in the German Pro-Superbike series, taking sixth place overall. In  he finished fifth in the Supersport World Championship, taking his first ever victory at Misano. In  he rode one of the official Ducati factory team Supersport bikes, finishing seventh and taking one victory.

Superbikes
For  he moved to the factory Ducati Superbike team in partnership with then-champion Troy Bayliss. He struggled early in the season, with a best result of 5th from the first 8 meetings. However, in race 2 at Oschersleben he became the first Spaniard ever to take victory in the Superbike World Championship. A pair of 2nds at Assen (helping Bayliss to clinch the title) and a second win at Imola gave him sixth in the championship.

MotoGP
Xaus made his move into the MotoGP World Championship in 2004 as part of the satellite D'Antin Ducati team. The team was grossly under funded and could not afford testing time, but Xaus adapted better to the situation than teammate Hodgson. Consistent points-scoring performances and a first podium at Qatar saw him snap up the ‘Rookie of the Year’ title and 11th place overall in the championship standings. In 2005 he moved to the Fortuna Yamaha Team to ride alongside his friend Toni Elías. But a more pronounced power delivery and difficult chassis and Xaus's charging/forced riding style meant he looked a different rider to the one of 2004. He crashed numerous times, finishing 16th overall with a best finish of 10th .

By season

Superbikes part 2
For  he returned to the Superbike World Championship, with a ride for the new Italian satellite Ducati team Sterilgarda Berik, alongside team owner Marco Borciani. He twice set the fastest lap, but his fast charges often ended in crashes, and he was only 14th overall.

He ended the  season 6th with a total 201 points (next behind the former world champion Troy Corser), scoring the team's first victory in Valencia.

For  Xaus was joined by Max Biaggi on a Ducati 1098R for Sterilgarda-GoEleven, under the team management of Borciani. He finished 2nd in race 2 at the season-opening event in Qatar and took a victory at Misano in Race 2 in front of Biaggi and Bayliss, but has had no further podiums. At Donington Park he believed he had finished 3rd in a race stopped by heavy rain, but found out immediately before the podium celebration that he had been disqualified for not returning to the pits quickly enough after crashing immediately before the race was stopped. He then refused to leave the podium and verbally assaulted the marshals, including the rider who inherited the third spot on the podium - his team-mate Max Biaggi. With three rounds remaining he lies 10th in the standings.

On 26 June 2008, Xaus signed to ride the BMW S1000RR bike for the factory BMW Motorrad team in the 2009 WSB Championship.

Personal data
On 16 March 2007 Xaus married long-term partner Mariona. The wedding was held in Andorra, where the couple live with their daughter Julia, who was born in November 2006.

Xaus' hobbies include mountain biking, snowboarding and golf. He is 183 cm tall and weighs 74 kg.

Career statistics

Grand Prix motorcycle racing

Races by year
(key) (Races in bold indicate pole position, races in italics indicate fastest lap)

Supersport World Championship

Races by year

Superbike World Championship

Races by year
(key) (Races in bold indicate pole position) (Races in italics indicate fastest lap)

References

External links

1978 births
Living people
Spanish motorcycle racers
Motorcycle racers from Catalonia
MotoGP World Championship riders
Superbike World Championship riders
Sportspeople from Barcelona
Supersport World Championship riders
Tech3 MotoGP riders